Peka may refer to:

Politics
PEKA or Politiki Epitropi Kypriakou Agona (The Political Committee of the Cypriot Struggle), political wing of the EOKA movement which fought against the British and Turkish Cypriots for the union of Cyprus with Greece between 1955 and 1959

Places
Peka (Lesotho), a city
Peka Bridge, a border post located between South Africa and Lesotho
Te Peka, a locality in the Southland region of New Zealand's South Island
Peka Peka, sometimes Pekapeka, a lightly populated seaside locality on the Kapiti Coast of New Zealand's North Island
 Peka, a nickname for Krešimir Ćosić Hall, a sporting arena in Zadar, Croatia

Persons
Avenir Peka (born 1978), Albanian politician and minister 
Jan Peka (1894–1985), Czechoslovak ice hockey player and Olympian
Lucia Peka (1912–1991), Latvian-American artist
Ludwig Peka, Papua New Guinean professional football manager

See also
Peka, the Croatian-language word for sač
Pekka (disambiguation)
Pekka (name)